Pseudoxistrella is an Asian genus of ground-hoppers (Orthoptera: Caelifera) in the subfamily Metrodorinae and not assigned to any tribe.

Species 
Pseudoxistrella currently consists of two species:
Pseudoxistrella belokobylskii Storozhenko & Omelko, 2012
Pseudoxistrella eurymera Liang, 1991 - type species, locality Hainan Island

References

External links 
 

Tetrigidae
Caelifera genera
Orthoptera of Indo-China